Eanhere was a possible ruler of Hwicce, one of the Anglo Saxon kingdoms of England, maybe reigning jointly with his brother Eanfrith. His niece, Eanfrith's daughter Eafe, married King Æðelwealh of Sussex. Unfortunately, the sole source of information concerning Eanhere is Bede, who just mentioned his name in passing, and did not actually state that Eanhere was a king:

"Porro regina, nomine Eabae, in sua, id est Huicciorum prouincia fuerat baptizata. Erat autem filia Eanfridi fratris Ænheri, qui ambo cum suo populo Christiani fuere."

Osric may have been a son of Eanhere, by Osthryth, daughter of Oswiu of Northumbria. The only marriage recorded for Osthryth is that to Æthelred of Mercia, but an earlier marriage to Eanhere would explain why Osric and his brother Oswald are described as Æthelred's nepotes - usually translated as nephews or grandsons, but here probably meaning stepsons.

Notes

External links
 

Hwiccan monarchs
7th-century English people